Khalilullah (born 1 December 1990) is a Pakistani cricketer. He made his first-class debut for Abbottabad in the 2012–13 Quaid-e-Azam Trophy on 8 January 2013.

References

External links
 

1990 births
Living people
Pakistani cricketers
Abbottabad cricketers
Multan cricketers
Place of birth missing (living people)